Mohammad Rivai Riza (born October 2, 1970), better known as Riri Riza, is an Indonesian film director, producer and writer. He is notable for his directorial work on Petualangan Sherina (Sherina's Adventure; 2000), Gie (2005), Laskar Pelangi (The Rainbow Troop; 2008), and Ada Apa Dengan Cinta? 2 (What's Up with Love? 2; 2016). He is also known for his creative partnership with Indonesian producer Mira Lesmana, with whom he manages the film production company, Miles Films.

Early life and education 
Riri Riza was born in Makassar on 2 October 1970. He moved to Jakarta in 1979, where he conducted his secondary education at LabSchool UNJ.

In 1993, Riza graduated from the Jakarta Arts Institute, where he majored in Film Directing. A talented student, his thesis film, Sonata Kampung Bata (Sonata of the Brick Village), placed third at the 1994 Oberhausen short film festival.

Career
In 1995, Riza directed two episodes in the documentary series, Anak Seribu Pulau (Children of the Thousand Islands).

He directed his first feature film, Kuldesak, in 1998, collaborating with Mira Lesmana, Nan Triveni Achnas and Rizal Mantovani. His solo feature film debut, Petualangan Sherina (Sherina's Adventure) in 2000, established him as a director.

Together with Mira Lesmana, Riza has also become a film producer. Their Ada Apa dengan Cinta? (What's Up With Love?), directed by Rudy Soedjarwo, had two million viewers in 2002, Indonesian cinema's biggest box-office draw.

Riza studied screenwriting at Royal Holloway, University of London, and then wrote his first screenplay Eliana, Eliana.

His other films include Gie, Untuk Rena (For Rena), and 3 Hari Untuk Selamanya (Three Days to Forever).

Filmography

Films

Short films

Awards and nominations

References

External links

 Riri Riza Profile at pdat.co.id

Indonesian film directors
Indonesian screenwriters
Indonesian film producers
Maya Award winners
Citra Award winners
1970 births
Living people
Chevening Scholars